The Bordered Yellow Banner was one of the Eight Banners of Manchu military and society during the Later Jin and Qing dynasty of China. The Bordered Yellow Banner was one of three "upper" banner armies under the direct command of the emperor himself, and one of the four "left wing" banners. The Plain Yellow Banner and the Bordered Yellow Banner were split from each other in 1615, when the troops of the original four banner armies (Yellow, Blue, Red, and White) were divided into eight by adding a bordered variant to each banner's design. The yellow banners were originally commanded personally by Nurhaci. After Nurhaci's death, his son Hong Taiji became khan, and took control of both yellow banners. Later, the Shunzhi Emperor took over the Plain White Banner after the death of his regent, Dorgon, to whom it previously belonged. From that point forward, the emperor directly controlled three "upper" banners (Plain Yellow, Bordered Yellow, and Plain White), as opposed to the other five "lower" banners. Because of the direct control of the three upper banners, there was no appointed banner commanders as opposed to the other five. The emperor's personal guards and guards of Forbidden City were also only selected from the upper three banners.

Notable people

Notable clans 

 Fuca clan
 Niohuru
 Tunggiya
 Sakda
 Nian
 Gao
 Erdet
 Gūwalgiya
 Zhangjia
 Duola'er
 Zhalali
 Fan
 Wei
 Ma
 Zhao
 Shi
 Gorolo
 Yanzha

References

Bibliography

Further reading